The Nan Movie (originally conceived as This Nan's Life) is a 2022 British comedy film written by Catherine Tate and Brett Goldstein and directed by Josie Rourke (uncredited). The film stars Tate and Mathew Horne. It is based on the television series, Catherine Tate's Nan, which is a set of four specials that were broadcast between 2009 and 2015, and itself is a spin-off of the television sketch series, The Catherine Tate Show (2004–2007). The film centres on the eponymous Nan character who travels cross-country to visit her dying sister, and includes several flashbacks to their upbringing and early adulthood.

Plot
Foul-mouthed and cantankerous London woman Joanie "Nan" Taylor's (Catherine Tate) grandson, Jamie (Mathew Horne), takes her to see the dying sister with whom she had a falling out when they were young women. Nan would rather just have a good time, however, and the road trip features many comedic detours alternated with flashbacks to the sisters in their youth.

Cast

Production

In early 2019, it was first announced that Catherine Tate would be reprising her role of Joanie Taylor, who first appeared in the sketch series, and subsequently, the spin-off series, for a feature film. The project, directed by Josie Rourke of the 2018 biographical drama, Mary Queen of Scots, announced via Instagram that the film would be titled This Nan's Life. Matthew Horne reprises his role as "Nan"'s long-suffering grandson, Jamie, as well as Niky Wardley, another well-known performer within the original series, and Katherine Parkinson. The film is written by Tate and former collaborator Brett Goldstein. Warner Bros. holds the distribution rights in the United Kingdom.

After initial filming, the film was retooled substantially. The film largely took place in 1940s London. Those scenes were scaled back and new footage, greatly expanding the modern-day road trip sections, was filmed without Rourke at a low-cost, with animation sequences also used to fill any gaps.

The film was scheduled to be released on 19 June 2020, but was indefinitely postponed due to cinemas being closed because of the COVID-19 pandemic. The trailer and poster for the film were released on 18 February 2022 with Josie Rourke receiving an executive producer credit and no director credited. The film was released on 18 March 2022. As a result of "technical reasons", Pete Bennett's role was reduced to a brief appearance.

Reception

Box office 
The Nan Movie was released on 18 March 2022 in 514 cinemas across the United Kingdom and Ireland. The film's theatrical gross on 4 May 2022 was $2,165,386.

Critical response 
The film received a resoundingly negative reception from critics. On review aggregation website Rotten Tomatoes, The Nan Movie has an approval rating of 0%, based on 13 reviews. The Guardian described it as "brutally unfunny", giving it one star out of five, The Telegraph as being "as interminable as it is revolting", also awarding 1/5, while the monthly film magazine Empire was slightly more positive, calling it "a mostly unfunny attempt to wring long-form laughs from a character who works better in short doses", awarding 2/5.

Bleeding Cool commented on the film's disjointed narrative, with the flashback scenes described as "a thoughtful, beautifully shot period piece set in London during the war", while the much more dominant present-day plot is a "dull-looking road trip from London to Ireland filled with boring, tedious irrelevant distractions that hurt the brain." The site's original review of The Nan Movie was entitled "Finding A Much Better Film Within", and commented on how no director is credited despite collaboration from Josie Rourke, who has previously directed historical dramas and stage plays. The Guardian'''s critic also commented on the relative quality of the flashbacks as compared to the other material.

The later article states that, according to its sources, when the original cut of the film was presented to its backers in 2019, the backers were uncomfortable with the wartime storyline. They requested that it be heavily cut to accommodate much more of the present-day plot with the elderly Joan Taylor, whom fans of The Catherine Tate Show'' will recognise. A good deal more of this material was then cheaply and hastily shot to replace the cut footage.

Accolades

References

External links
 
 Official website

2022 films
British comedy films
Films based on television series
Films shot in Dublin (city)
Films postponed due to the COVID-19 pandemic
2020s English-language films
2020s British films